Central San Vicente was the first sugarcane refinery in Puerto Rico, established in 1873 by Leonardo Igaravidez at Vega Baja.

History 
In 1850, Manuel Lopez Landron founded the Hacienda San Vicente. After his death, his widow married Leonardo Igaravidez Maldonado (Vega Alta, 1830-1888), marquis of Cabo Caribe, who bought the neighboring plantations of Felicidad, Santa Inés, Fe and Rosario. He bought French machinery that allowed integration of the sugarcane fabrication process into a fully mechanized production flow. On January 30, 1872, a railroad opened for cane transport from the plantations to the Central. 

In 1878, after its bankruptcy for a debt of more than 1 million pesos, the plant was bought by José Gallart. In 1880 four more Centrales operated in Puerto Rico: Luisa, San Francisco, Coloso and Canóvanas. In 1896, Gallart sold it to Rubert Hermanos, who owned four additional plants with the Compañía Fabián, changing its name to Central San Vicente, Inc. In 1935 it had a grinding capacity of 1.500 tons daily, growing to 5,600 tons at 1958. In 1952 it achieve its greatest production, grinding 71.280 tons.

San Vicente closed in 1967, after it was sold to La Corporación Azucarera in 1972 who sold it off in pieces. Some of the machinery was sold to el ingenio la Grecia in Choluteca, Honduras. 

The chimney was rebuilt in 1952. Its ruins include two fireplaces, part of an oven, a crane, brick and walls, tanks and parts of a "Farrel" steam engine. It is located in the carr. 688, of the Cabo Caribe neighborhood, Vega Baja.

See also 

Central Coloso
Central Cortada
Central Guánica

References

Bibliography

External links 

Industrial buildings and structures in Puerto Rico
Sugar refineries
Sugar industry in Puerto Rico
1873 establishments in Puerto Rico
Industrial buildings completed in 1873
Vega Baja, Puerto Rico